Michael John Garzoni (August 19, 1923July 18, 2007) was an American football offensive lineman in the National Football League for the Washington Redskins and the New York Giants.  He also played for the New York Yankees in the All-America Football Conference.  He played college football at Fresno State University and the University of Southern California.

1923 births
2007 deaths
Players of American football from Los Angeles
American football offensive guards
USC Trojans football players
Fresno State Bulldogs football players
Washington Redskins players
New York Giants players
New York Yankees (AAFC) players